The Crusaders (formerly known as The Jazz Crusaders) were an American jazz group that was successful from the 1960s to the 1990s. The group was known as the Jazz Crusaders from their formation in 1960 until shortening their name in 1971. The Crusaders were comfortable playing a wide assortment of genres, from straight ahead jazz, to urban R&B, to R&B-based jazz, to even blues. The band reached a commercial apex in 1979 with their hit single "Street Life", featuring lead vocals by Randy Crawford, and their accompanying album of the same name.

History

High school friends Joe Sample (piano), Wilton Felder (tenor saxophone) and Nesbert "Stix" Hooper (drums) formed their first band together, the Swingsters, in Houston, Texas in 1954. They played a mixture of jazz and R&B, and were joined by Wayne Henderson (trombone), Hubert Laws (flute), and Henry Wilson (bass). The group soon turned more to hard bop, and renamed themselves the Modern Jazz Sextet, but also recorded in a more R&B vein as the Nighthawks (or Nite Hawks).

In 1960, Sample, Felder, Hooper and Henderson moved to Los Angeles and formed the Jazz Crusaders as a quintet with a succession of different bass players. Influenced by musicians such as Cannonball Adderley, Art Blakey and John Coltrane, the band signed to the Pacific Jazz label in 1961, and released 16 albums on the label over the subsequent eight years. With a front-line horn section of Felder and Henderson, the group's sound was rooted in hard bop, but with a slant towards R&B and soul music.

Their first two albums, with  Jimmy Bond on bass, were Freedom Sound (1961), and Lookin' Ahead (1962), followed by the live album At the Lighthouse (1962) and Tough Talk, the first of several albums with bassist Bobby Haynes. In all, the group recorded five live albums in the 1960s, four of which were recorded at the Lighthouse Café in Hermosa Beach. They also had their first chart entry, their treatment of Stevie Wonder's "Uptight (Everything's Alright)" reaching No. 95 on the Hot 100 in 1966. The group's 1969 album, Powerhouse, was their first to reach the Billboard 200 album chart, reaching No. 184, and was also their last studio album for Pacific Jazz.

The group then signed with the Chisa label, co-owned by trumpeter Hugh Masekela and producer Stewart Levine. Their 1970 album Old Socks, New Shoes reached No. 90 on the album chart, and was their last as the Jazz Crusaders. The decision was taken to call the group simply the Crusaders, so as not to limit their scope and potential audience. After a second album with Chisa, (Pass the Plate, 1971), and one album for the MoWest label (Hollywood, 1972) they signed with Blue Thumb Records, where they remained until the late 1970s. Their recordings increasingly adopted a jazz-funk style. They incorporated electric guitar and bass into their shows and recordings, as well as using Sample's electric piano and clavinet. Guitarist Larry Carlton joined and featured on their albums in the early part of the decade. Bass duties were often handled by Felder, with Max Bennett contributing in the early/mid-70's and Robert "Pops" Popwell joining later in the decade. 

According to jazz critic Scott Yanow at AllMusic, however, "after a few excellent albums during the early part of the decade... the group began to decline in quality." Sample later commented that the group was under commercial pressure from record companies to record jazzed-up versions of contemporary popular songs. Henderson left to become a record producer in 1975, and the other musicians regularly and increasingly worked as session musicians with artists such as the Jackson 5, Marvin Gaye, Joni Mitchell, Steely Dan, and Randy Newman. With a growing crossover appeal, the group's most commercially successful recordings included the single "Put It Where You Want It" (No. 52 pop, 1972), and the albums The 2nd Crusade (No. 45 album, 1973), Southern Comfort (No. 31 album, 1974), Chain Reaction (No. 26 album, 1975), Those Southern Knights (No. 38 album, 1976), and Images (No. 34 album, 1978). 

The peak of the group's commercial success came with 1979's Street Life, with Randy Crawford as featured singer. The album peaked at No. 18 on the pop album charts and the title track made the top 10 on the R&B chart, No. 36 on Billboard′s Hot 100 chart, and No. 5 in the UK. Later albums by the group featured singers Bill Withers and Joe Cocker. The live 1982 album Royal Jam featured guitarist B. B. King, bassist James Jamerson, and the Royal Philharmonic Orchestra. Hooper left in 1983, and though Felder and Sample kept the group operating through the 1980s, the group's commercial success diminished.

Felder and Henderson reunited in the mid-1990s as the Crusaders. Henderson later led a band called the Jazz Crusaders, in which Felder and Carlton also played, and Felder and Sample reunited as the Crusaders in 2003.

Wayne Henderson died in Culver City, California on April 5, 2014; Joe Sample died in Houston, Texas on September 12, 2014; and Wilton Felder died in Whittier, California on September 27, 2015.

Discography

As the Jazz Crusaders
 Freedom Sound (Pacific Jazz, 1961)
 Lookin' Ahead (Pacific Jazz, 1962)
 The Jazz Crusaders at the Lighthouse (Pacific Jazz, 1962)
 Tough Talk (Pacific Jazz, 1963)
 Heat Wave (Pacific Jazz, 1963)
 Jazz Waltz (Pacific Jazz, 1963) with Les McCann
 Stretchin' Out (Pacific Jazz, 1964)
 The Thing (Pacific Jazz, 1965)
 Chile Con Soul (Pacific Jazz, 1965)
 Live at the Lighthouse '66 (Pacific Jazz, 1966)
 Talk That Talk (Pacific Jazz, 1966)
 The Festival Album (Pacific Jazz, 1966)
 Uh Huh (Pacific Jazz, 1967)
 Lighthouse '68 (Pacific Jazz, 1968)
 Powerhouse (Pacific Jazz, 1969)
 Lighthouse '69 (Pacific Jazz, 1969)
 Give Peace a Chance (Liberty, 1970)
 Old Socks New Shoes – New Socks Old Shoes (Chisa, 1970)

Source:

As the Crusaders
 Pass the Plate (Chisa, 1971)
 Hollywood (MoWest, 1972)
 Crusaders 1 (Blue Thumb, 1972)
 The 2nd Crusade (Blue Thumb, 1973)
 Unsung Heroes (Blue Thumb, 1973)
 Scratch (Blue Thumb, 1974)
 Southern Comfort (Blue Thumb, 1974)
 Chain Reaction (Blue Thumb, 1975)
 Those Southern Knights (Blue Thumb, 1976)
 Free as the Wind (Blue Thumb, 1977)
 Images (Blue Thumb, 1978)
 Street Life (MCA, 1979)
 Rhapsody and Blues (MCA, 1980)
 Ongaku Kai - Live in Japan (Crusaders, 1981; GRP, 1993)
 Standing Tall (MCA, 1981)
 Royal Jam (MCA, 1982) with B.B. King
 Ghetto Blaster (MCA, 1984)
 The Good and Bad Times (MCA, 1986)
 Life in the Modern World (MCA, 1988)
 Healing the Wounds (GRP, 1991)
 Rural Renewal (Verve, 2003)
 Live in Japan 2003 (P.R.A., 2004)

As the Jazz Crusaders
n.b. (Wayne Henderson & Wilton Felder)
 Happy Again (Sin-Drome, 1994)
 Louisiana Hot Sauce (Sin-Drome, 1996)
 Break'n Da Rulz! (Indigo Blue, 1998)
 Power of Our Music: The Endangered Species (Indigo Blue, 2000)
 Soul Axess (True Life, 2003)
 Alive in South Africa (True Life, 2006)

References

External links

American jazz ensembles from Texas
Musical groups established in 1952
Musical groups disestablished in 2010
Soul-jazz musicians
Smooth jazz ensembles
MCA Records artists
Blue Note Records artists
ABC Records artists
Blue Thumb Records artists
GRP Records artists
1952 establishments in Texas
2010 disestablishments in Texas